MarTay Jenkins (born February 28, 1975) is a former American football wide receiver in the National Football League for the Arizona Cardinals. He also was a member of the Arizona Rattlers in the Arena Football League and the Calgary Stampeders in the Canadian Football League. He played college football at the University of Nebraska Omaha.

Early years
Jenkins was born in Waterloo, Iowa and attended Herbert Hoover High School in Des Moines, Iowa as a freshman and sophomore. He would then transfer to Des Moines North High School, where he practiced football, basketball and track.

College career
Jenkins attended North Iowa Area Community College. He was part of the 26-24 win against Rochester Community and Technical College in the 1995 RC Cola Bowl.

He transferred to the Division II University of Nebraska-Omaha in 1996. As a sophomore, playing in a run oriented offense, he led the team with 36 receptions for 848 yards, 8 receiving touchdowns (school record), 4 carries for 42 yards (10.5-yard avg.) and one rushing touchdown. Against North Dakota State University, he tallied 166 receiving yards and 3 touchdowns. He was an All-Nebraska NCAA Division II selection by the Omaha World-Herald.

In 1997, he suffered a torn left anterior cruciate ligament in the opening game against the University of Central Missouri, after making a 32-yard touchdown reception, forcing him to miss the rest of the season.

Jenkins returned to complete his senior season in 1998, leading the team with 29 receptions for 540 yards (18.6-yard avg.) and 3 receiving touchdowns, while also posting 10 carries for 171 yards (17.1-yard avg.) and 3 rushing touchdown. He averaged 30.3 yards in 7 kickoff returns. Against North Dakota State University, he had 7 receptions for 147 yards, 2 receiving touchdowns and a 34-yard run. He received All-Nebraska NCAA Division II honors by the Omaha World-Herald.  

He finished his college career registering in less than three full seasons, 67 receptions for 1,439 yards (21.5 avg.) and 12 touchdowns. He also returned 24 kickoffs for 597 yards (24.9) and one touchdown, while rushing 14 times for 213 yards and 4 touchdowns. He helped the Mavericks win North Central Conference titles both seasons he played, which were their first league championships in 12 years.

In 2007, he was inducted into the University of Nebraska-Omaha Athletic Hall of Fame. In 2011, he was inducted into the National Junior College Athletic Association Football Hall of Fame.

Professional career

National Football League
Jenkins was selected by the Dallas Cowboys in the sixth round (193rd overall) of the 1999 NFL Draft. He was released on September 5. He was claimed off waivers by the Arizona Cardinals on September 6 and played in 3 games, after being declared inactive in 13 contests.

In 2000, he played in 16 games finishing with an NFL record of 2,186 kickoff return yards. On December 10, Jenkins broke three league records in a 44-10 Cardinals loss to the Jacksonville Jaguars, that included the record for kickoff returns in a season, kickoff return yardage in a season and combined kickoff and punt return yardage in a season.

On September 22, 2002, Jenkins recorded a 65-yard touchdown reception from quarterback Jake Plummer, which allowed Plummer to surpass 15,000 yards passing for his career. On November 3, he suffered a fractured scapula. On November 5, he was placed on the injured reserve list.

Jenkins was released in 2003, after asking for a contract similar to the $3 million-a-year contract that San Diego Chargers wide receiver/kick returner Tim Dwight had signed the year prior. On March 21, it was reported that the Houston Texans offered Jenkins a contract. One week later, Jenkins was signed to a contract with the Atlanta Falcons on March 28. He was released by the Falcons on August 30. On September 11, he was re-signed by the Cardinals, however, he failed a team physical nullifying the contract. On December 30, Jenkins was signed to a futures contract by the Denver Broncos, reuniting with quarterback Jake Plummer. He was released on July 27, 2004.

Arena Football League
On October 21, 2004, Jenkins signed with the Arizona Rattlers of the Arena Football League. He was released on January 21, 2005.

Canadian Football League
On March 2, 2005, he signed with the Calgary Stampeders of the Canadian Football League. For the season, he recorded 25 receptions for 382 yards and 4 touchdowns.

Personal life
Jenkins was the Founder, CEO/President of Stand Out Sports an athletic training company in Arizona. He married Camille Jenkins in 2006.

References

1975 births
Living people
Sportspeople from Waterloo, Iowa
Players of American football from Iowa
American football wide receivers
American football return specialists
Nebraska–Omaha Mavericks football players
Dallas Cowboys players
Arizona Cardinals players
Arizona Rattlers players
Calgary Stampeders players